Öffa bills ("ö" is a Germanic umlaut that can be transcribed "oe") or job-creation bills were promissory notes created in 1932 by the German government. They were  aimed at  additional fund-raising for public building initiatives and later for job creation schemes. 

The Öffa bills were the blueprint for the Mefo bills which followed the same scheme.

History 
In 1932, Öffa bills were created by the second cabinet under chancellor Heinrich Brüning after consultation with the then President of the Reichsbank, Hans Luther.
The bills were issued by the Deutsche Gesellschaft für öffentliche Arbeiten AG, founded 1 August 1930,  and rediscounted by the Reichsbank. With the capital thus raised, the Deutsche Gesellschaft für öffentliche Arbeiten AG financed public building initiatives. 
It was a shell company without sufficient shareholders' equity. Nevertheless, the bills were discounted by the Reichsbank. This way, the Reichsbank financed public building projects. 

In the wake of the Great Depression, this hidden money creation stimulated the German economy. The German Deutsche Gesellschaft für öffentliche Arbeiten AG brought into circulation Öffa bills worth 1.26 billion Reichsmark. In general, the duration of a bill was three months but it could be prolonged to five years. 

Economically, this meant an expansion of the money supply. As this would tend towards increasing inflation, Hans Luther agreed to only a small volume.

Kurt von Schleicher's second cabinet decided to expand the Öffa bill scheme. Öffa bills could now be issued by other (mostly public) financial institutions such as the Deutsche Verkehrskreditbank AG which had issued Öffa bills worth 1 billion Reichsmark. After becoming Chancellor in January 1933, Adolf Hitler wanted to extend the scheme to the German re-armament, Hans Luther disagreed, and he was replaced on 16 March 1933 by Hjalmar Schacht. Schacht instituted the Mefo bills, a similar system to the Öffa bills.

See also 

 Mefo bills

References

Payment systems
Economy of Nazi Germany